Dendropsophus manonegra is a frog in the family Hylidae.  It is endemic to Colombia.  Scientists have seen it between 400 and 1200 meters above sea level.

References

Amphibians described in 2013
Frogs of South America
Endemic fauna of Colombia
manonegra